Morocco competed at the 2019 African Games held from 19 to 31 August 2019 in Rabat, Morocco. This was the first time that Morocco hosted the competition. It was also the first time since the 1978 All-Africa Games that Morocco took part in the competition after being banned. In total, athletes representing Morocco won 31 gold medals, 32 silver medals and 46 bronze medals and the country finished in 5th place in the medal table.

Medal summary

Medal table 

|  style="text-align:left; width:78%; vertical-align:top;"|

|  style="text-align:left; width:22%; vertical-align:top;"|

Archery 

Omar El Boussouni, Ismail Elalaoui, Mohamed Jelloun, Malak Charif, Loubna Farfra and Maryem Zamkhakh competed in archery. They did not win any medals.

Athletics 

Athletes representing Morocco in athletics won six silver medals and five bronze medals and the country finished in 14th place in the athletics medal table.

Mohamed Reda El Aaraby won the silver medal in the men's half marathon and Hamza Sahli won the bronze medal in that event.

Marouane Kacimi won the silver medal in the men's long jump event.

Oussama Nabil won the bronze medal in the men's 800 metres event.

Soufiane El Bakkali won the bronze medal in the men's 3000 metres steeplechase event.

Elbachir Mbarki won the bronze medal in the men's discus throw event.

Marouane Kacimi won the bronze medal in the men's decathlon.

Badminton 

Morocco competed in badminton. No medals were won.

Boxing 

Morocco competed in boxing and, in total, four gold medals, two silver medals and one bronze medal were won. The country finished 1st in the boxing medal table.

Canoeing 

Laila Bouchir and Chaymaa Guemra won the gold medal in the women's K-2 200 metres event.

Bouchir and Guemra also competed in the women's K-4 500 metres event together with Zina Aboudalal and Salma Khabot and they won the bronze medal.

Chess 

Hicham Hamdouchi, Mohamed Tissir, Firdaous Mayar El Idrissi and Rania Sbai are scheduled to compete in chess.

Equestrian 

Morocco competed in equestrian and won two gold medals, one silver medal and one bronze medal.

In the team jumping event Morocco won the gold medal.

In the individual jumping event all medals went to equestrians representing Morocco: El Ghali Boukaa won the gold medal, Abdelkebir Ouaddar won the silver medal and Vincent Zacharias Bourguignon won the bronze medal.

Fencing 

Morocco competed in fencing. Fencers representing Morocco won one gold medal, two silver medals and four bronze medals. The country finished third in the fencing medal table.

Football 

Morocco competed in both the men's tournament and women's tournament.

The men's team competed in the group stage and did not advance to the semi-finals.

The women's team won the bronze medal in their tournament.

Gymnastics 

Morocco competed in gymnastics.

In total, two medals were won: the bronze medal in the men's team all-around event and Nabil Zouhair won the bronze medal in the men's floor exercise event.

Handball 

Both Morocco's national handball team and women's national football team competed in handball.

The men's team won the bronze medal in the men's tournament.

The women's team reached the quarterfinals.

Judo 

Men
–60 kg:  Issam Bassou
–60 kg:  Younes Saddiki
–66 kg:  Abderrahmane Boushita
–73 kg:  Hamza Kabdani
–100 kg:  Mohammed Lahboub

Women
–48 kg:  Chaimae Eddinari
–52 kg:  Soumiya Iraoui
–52 kg:  Lamia Eddinari
–63 kg:  Sofia Belattar

Karate 

Morocco competed in karate. In total, athletes representing Morocco won nine gold medals, four silver medals and two bronze medals and the country finished 1st in the karate medal table.

Rowing 

Abdeslam Assermouh, Hicham Benabdallah, Manal Chaffoui, Achraf El Alami, Majdouline El Allaoui, Abdelhak Ellamman and Sarah Juliette Saidi Fraincart are scheduled to compete in rowing.

Shooting 

Morocco competed in shooting. In total, athletes representing Morocco won two gold medals, three silver medals and two bronze medals and the country finished 2nd in the shooting medal table.

Snooker 

Amine Amiri, Yassine Bellamine, Hakima Kissai and Youssra Matine competed in snooker. In total, they won three gold medals, one silver medal and two bronze medals.

Swimming 

Swimmers representing Morocco won four bronze medals in total.

Driss Lahrichi won the bronze medal in the men's 50 metre backstroke event.

Yusuf Tibazi won the bronze medal in the men's 100 metre butterfly event.

Souhail Hamouchane, Driss Lahrichi, Merwane El Merini and Samy Boutouil won the bronze medal in the men's 4 × 100 metre freestyle relay event.

Driss Lahrichi, Hiba Laknit, Yusuf Tibazi, Noura Mana, Adil Assouab and Samy Boutouil won the bronze medal in the 4 × 100 metre mixed medley relay event.

Table tennis 

Morocco competed in table tennis.

Taekwondo 

In total, five gold medals, two silver medals and four bronze medals were won in Taekwondo and Morocco finished in 1st place in the Taekwondo medal table.

Tennis 

Morocco competed in tennis. Tennis players representing Morocco won one gold medal, two silver medals and two bronze medals.

Triathlon 

Badr Siwane won the gold medal in the men's event and Mohammed El Mehdi Essadiq won the silver medal in that event.

Nabil Kouzkouz also competed in the men's event. He finished in 5th place.

Karima Kanoun, Samia M'Safer and Oumaima El Atrassi also competed in the women's event. They finished in 8th, 12th and 13th place respectively.

In the mixed relay event Morocco finished in 4th place.

Volleyball 

Morocco men's national volleyball team competed in the men's tournament.

The women's national volleyball team won the bronze medal in the women's tournament.

Weightlifting 

Morocco competed in weightlifting and won one silver medal and four bronze medals.

Issam Harfi won the silver medal in the men's 55 kg Snatch event. He also won the bronze medals in the 55 kg Clean & jerk and 55 kg Total events.

Mohamed Moulabbi won the bronze medal in the men's 67 kg Clean & jerk event and the 67 kg Total event.

Wrestling 

Ten athletes represented Morocco in wrestling.

Men's freestyle

Men's Greco-Roman

References 

Nations at the 2019 African Games
2019
African Games